Bank Bridge (Russian: Bankovsky most, Банковский мост) is a  long pedestrian bridge crossing the Griboedov Canal near the former Assignation Bank in Saint Petersburg, Russia. Similar to other bridges across the canal, the existing structure dates from 1826. The bridge engineer was Wilhelm von Traitteur, who conceived of a pedestrian separation structure suspended by cables. He was an engineer who also built other bridges over the Griboyedov Canal, Fontanka and Moika. The general management of the bridge construction was carried out by colonel E. A. Adam.

The special popularity of the bridge was gained through angular sculptures of four winged lions crowning the abutments. They were designed by sculptor Pavel Sokolov (1764–1835), who also contributed lions for Bridge of Lions and sphinxes for Egyptian Bridge. The bridge is in front of the former Assignation Bank building (now housing the Saint Petersburg State University of Economics and Finance).

The bridge underwent numerous repairs and restorations, as well as structural modifications. In 1949 the wooden cover of the bridge was repaired, and later in 1951–1952 the wooden bearing structure of the bridge was replaced by a metal one. In 1967 and 1988 the gilding of the lions’ wings was renovated. In 1997 the sculptures and handrail lattice were restored. In 2007-2008 Griboyedov Canal Embankment from Kazan Cathedral to the Bank Bridge was renovated. Nowadays the winged lions are the symbol of St. Petersburg University of Economics and Finance.

A local legend says that rubbing the paw of one of the winged lions paw will lead to great wealth.

External links
 

Pedestrian bridges in Russia
Bridges in Saint Petersburg
Bridges completed in 1826
1826 establishments in the Russian Empire
Cultural heritage monuments of federal significance in Saint Petersburg